Adam McKay (born April 17, 1968) is an American film director, producer, screenwriter, and comedian. McKay began his career as a head writer for the NBC sketch comedy show Saturday Night Live from 1995 to 2001. Following his departure from SNL, he rose to fame in the 2000s for his collaborations with comedian Will Ferrell and co-wrote his comedy films Anchorman,  Talladega Nights, and The Other Guys. Ferrell and McKay later co-wrote and co-produced numerous television series and films, with McKay himself co-producing their website Funny or Die through their company Gary Sanchez Productions.

McKay began venturing into more dramatic territory in the 2010s. The Big Short was his first film he directed without Ferrell in the cast. For this film, McKay was nominated for several awards including two Academy Awards, Best Director and Best Adapted Screenplay (with co-writer Charles Randolph), and two British Academy Film Awards, Best Director and Best Adapted Screenplay. McKay and Randolph won Best Adapted Screenplay at the Academy Awards, the BAFTA Film Awards, and the WGA Awards. For his work on the Dick Cheney biographical film Vice, McKay received Academy Award nominations for Best Picture, Best Director and Best Original Screenplay. In 2019, McKay founded Hyperobject Industries. In 2022, he received Academy Award nominations for Best Picture and Best Original Screenplay for his latest work on the apocalyptic comedy film Don't Look Up.

Early life
McKay was born in Denver and was raised in Worcester, Massachusetts and later Malvern, Pennsylvania by a mother who was a waitress, Sarah, and a musician father. When McKay was seven his parents divorced. He attended Great Valley High School in Malvern, where he graduated in 1986. He then attended Pennsylvania State University for a year before transferring to Temple University, where he majored in English. McKay dropped out of Temple a semester-and-a-half before he was set to earn his bachelor's degree. He described it as "settling with an imaginary degree".

He is one of the founding members of the Upright Citizens Brigade improv comedy group and a former performer at Chicago's ImprovOlympic, where he was a member of the improv group, The Family, whose members included Matt Besser, Ian Roberts, Neil Flynn, Miles Stroth, and Ali Farahnakian, as well as Child's Play Touring Theatre.

Career

Writing, acting, and producing
McKay originally auditioned for Saturday Night Live to be an onscreen performer, but did not make the cut. However, the scripts he submitted earned him a job as a writer from 1995, and within a year McKay became head writer at age 27, a position he held until 2001. He also directed a number of short films for the show, including the original SNL Digital Shorts. McKay encouraged his Second City friend Tina Fey to submit some of her scripts to Saturday Night Live, and she later succeeded him as head writer. Though McKay was never an actual SNL cast member, he did make several on-camera appearances over the years and had a recurring role as an obnoxious audience member "Keith" who would often shout insults at the celebrity hosts during their opening monologue.

Shortly after leaving SNL, McKay teamed up with comedian Will Ferrell to form Gary Sanchez Productions and write the comedy films Anchorman: The Legend of Ron Burgundy (2004), Talladega Nights: The Ballad of Ricky Bobby (2006), Step Brothers (2008), and The Other Guys (2010), all of which he also directed, produced and made cameo appearances in as an actor. Ferrell and McKay co-produced the HBO series Eastbound & Down.

McKay was one of the writers for the film The Campaign (2012), and produced the film Daddy's Home (2015), the latter of which reunited The Other Guys stars Ferrell and Mark Wahlberg, and was directed by Sean Anders. McKay wrote the screenplay for and directed The Big Short (2015), the film adaptation of Michael Lewis' book of the same name about the financial and subprime mortgage crisis of 2007-2008, and the build-up of the financial and credit bubble; the film starred Brad Pitt, Christian Bale, Ryan Gosling, Steve Carell, Melissa Leo, Marisa Tomei, and Byron Mann. McKay rewrote the script for the Marvel Studios feature film Ant-Man, directed by Peyton Reed. McKay also worked with Reed, Paul Rudd, Gabriel Ferrari & Andrew Barrer on Ant-Man and the Wasp to flesh out the story. He has also expressed interest in helming a Silver Surfer movie for Marvel Studios.

He produced the films Land of the Lost (2009), The Goods: Live Hard, Sell Hard (2009), The Virginity Hit (2010), Casa de Mi Padre (2012), Bachelorette (2012), Tim and Eric's Billion Dollar Movie (2012), The Campaign (2012), Hansel & Gretel: Witch Hunters (2013), Tammy (2014), Welcome to Me (2014), Get Hard (2015), Sleeping with Other People (2015), Daddy's Home (2015), and The Boss (2016).

In addition to Eastbound & Down, McKay has produced the TV series Big Lake and Succession, whose pilot he directed, and the miniseries The Spoils of Babylon, and The Chris Gethard Show.

In April 2019, McKay and Ferrell announced that they were separating as producing partners but would continue producing all projects currently in development or in production at Gary Sanchez Productions.

In 2019, McKay launched a new production company, Hyperobject Industries, which has a first look overall TV deal with HBO and a first look feature deal at Paramount Pictures. Hyperobject Industries' first TV project was an HBO pilot based on Jeff Pearlman's non-fiction book 'Showtime: Magic, Kareem, Riley and the Los Angeles Lakers Dynasty of the 1980s.' McKay directed the pilot. More recently, McKay's Hyperobject Industries has a first look deal with Apple.

Directing

McKay has directed, and co-written with Will Ferrell, the films Anchorman: The Legend of Ron Burgundy (2004), Talladega Nights: The Ballad of Ricky Bobby (2006), Step Brothers (2008), The Other Guys (2010), and Anchorman 2: The Legend Continues (2013). He has directed an "alternate film" about Ron Burgundy that is considered a companion to Anchorman: The Legend of Ron Burgundy (2004) entitled Wake Up, Ron Burgundy: The Lost Movie (2004), which is made up mostly of alternative takes, deleted scenes, and scrapped sub-plots from the original film strung together with a narrative.

McKay directed and co-wrote with Ferrell the George W. Bush Broadway show You're Welcome America. He produced the horror-action film Hansel & Gretel: Witch Hunters.

McKay directed the TV movie documentary Lifecasters (2013). He has directed a number of short films, including digital shorts for Saturday Night Live, and the short video "Good Cop, Baby Cop" for Funny or Die that stars his daughter Pearl. Among the other short films he has directed include The Procedure (2007) starring Will Ferrell, Willem Dafoe, and Andy Richter, Green Team (2008) starring Ferrell, John C. Reilly, and himself, and the K-Swiss commercial, Kenny Powers: The K-Swiss MFCEO (2011), starring Danny McBride as Kenny Powers from Eastbound & Down, which he co-produces with Ferrell and has also directed an episode of.

He directed and wrote the film adaptation of the Michael Lewis non-fiction book The Big Short, released in 2015. He received a nomination for the Academy Award for Best Director and the Academy Award for Best Adapted Screenplay for his work in the film, winning his first Academy Award in the latter category. In 2016, he and co-writer Charles Randolph received the USC Scripter Award for their screenplay.

In 2016, he became attached to the superhero film Irredeemable based on the comic of the same name by Mark Waid.

In November 2016, McKay began development of the biographical black comedy Backseat, about former U.S. Vice President Dick Cheney and his rise to power, though the title was eventually changed to Vice. Starring Christian Bale as Cheney, the film was released in the United States on December 25, 2018, by Annapurna Pictures. Despite polarized reviews, Vice received eight nominations at the 91st Academy Awards, including the Best Picture and McKay's second nomination for Best Director, and won for Best Make-Up and Hairstyling.

McKay's most recent film is a comedy drama, Don't Look Up, about two low level scientists trying to convince the world that a catastrophic comet is coming. McKay wrote the script and produced the film for Netflix. Jennifer Lawrence, Leonardo DiCaprio, Jonah Hill, Meryl Streep, and Cate Blanchett star in the film. It received a limited theatrical release in December 2021, before streaming on Netflix later in the month. The film received four nominations at the 94th Academy Awards, including Best Picture.

McKay will work with Jennifer Lawrence for a biographical film titled Bad Blood which tells the story of entrepreneur Elizabeth Holmes, based on the book Bad Blood: Secrets and Lies in a Silicon Valley Startup. It is in development and will be produced by Legendary Pictures and released by Universal Pictures. Vanessa Taylor is writing the script. In December 2021, the project was picked up by Apple Studios, with McKay now writing.

Funny or Die 
In 2007, McKay and Ferrell launched the user-submitted comedy video site Funny or Die. A video on the site, titled The Landlord, features both him and his young daughter, Pearl, whom Ferrell and his wife bait to say curse words. Pearl also starred in a second video titled Good Cop, Baby Cop.

Podcasting
From November 2015 until October 2016, McKay hosted the science/comedy podcast Surprisingly Awesome with Adam Davidson, produced by Gimlet Media. McKay additionally produced "Broken: Jeffrey Epstein" and "Broken: Seeking Justice," a podcast series that explored the Jeffrey Epstein case. His next podcast project, Death at the Wing, investigated a series of deaths among high-profile young basketball players in the 1980s and 1990s. In February 2022, he appeared as a guest on Smartless, a comedic podcast hosted by Jason Bateman, Will Arnett and Sean Hayes.

Personal life
In 1999, he married Shira Piven, a film and television director. They have two daughters, Lili Rose and Pearl. His brother-in-law is actor Jeremy Piven.

Politics 
McKay supports Gun control and Abortion-rights.

He is known to be critical of former President Bill Clinton “I legitimately think Bill Clinton is one of the worst presidents in the modern age”. McKay criticized Clinton for deregulating banks and for his personal life in light of the MeToo movement.

McKay serves on the Creative Council of RepresentUs, a nonpartisan anti-corruption organization. He is a supporter of the Democratic Party and endorsed Bernie Sanders for President of the United States in 2016 and again in 2020. He identifies as a democratic socialist and joined the Democratic Socialists of America in 2019.

Health 
McKay first noticed shaking in his hands while performing with Second City at age 26. He was diagnosed with essential tremor in around 2000. The condition causes his body and voice to quiver. He conducts print interviews lying down and televised ones in a special high backed chair to accommodate his disability. McKay had a heart attack while filming the biopic Vice starring Christian Bale, whose character Dick Cheney has multiple heart attacks in the film. The director credits his awareness of the issue from researching the film with his quick response that got him to the hospital before there was any permanent damage. During an interview on the 347th episode of The Empire Film Podcast, McKay said "Either Christian Bale or Dick Cheney just saved my life."

Filmography

Film 

Acting roles

Television 

Executive producer only

Acting roles

Web

Awards and nominations

Directed Academy Award performances

References

External links
 

1968 births
Living people
Film producers from Pennsylvania
American film producers
American male screenwriters
American sketch comedians
American television directors
California Democrats
California socialists
Comedy film directors
Television producers from Pennsylvania
American television writers
Best Adapted Screenplay Academy Award winners
Best Adapted Screenplay BAFTA Award winners
Comedians from Pennsylvania
Film directors from Pennsylvania
Funny or Die
Male actors from Philadelphia
American male television writers
Members of the Democratic Socialists of America
Pennsylvania Democrats
Pennsylvania socialists
Pennsylvania State University alumni
Primetime Emmy Award winners
Temple University alumni
Writers Guild of America Award winners
Screenwriters from Pennsylvania
20th-century American male actors
21st-century American male actors
20th-century American comedians
21st-century American comedians
Actors with disabilities
Writers with disabilities